Gloria Akuffo (born 31 December 1954) is a Ghanaian lawyer and politician who serves as the Attorney General of Ghana and Minister for Justice, since 2017. She is a former Deputy Attorney General and Aviation Minister.

Early life and education 
She was born on 31 December 1954 in Accra and comes from Akropong-Akuapem in the Eastern Region and Shai Osudoku in the Greater Accra Region. Gloria Akuffo graduated in 1979 from the University of Ghana with a B.A. (Hons) in Law and Political Science. She became a barrister and solicitor of the Supreme Court of Judicature of Ghana, enrolling at the Ghana Bar Association in 1982.

Career 
She was a founding partner in a private legal firm, Owusu-Yeboa, Akuffo & Associates, in Accra. She is Head of Litigation at Blay and Associates.

Politics 
She is a member of the New Patriotic Party. From 2001 to 2005 Akuffo was Deputy Minister of Justice and Deputy Attorney General, the first woman to hold these positions. From 2005 to 2006 Akuffo was Deputy Minister for the Greater Accra Region. Akuffo served as the first Minister of Aviation from 2006 till July 2008. She was appointed Ambassador to Ireland in July 2008.

2012 Election Petition 
Gloria was a key member of the legal team of New Patriotic Party during the 2012 election petition with Philip Addison as the lead counsel.

References

1954 births
Living people
Ghanaian women lawyers
University of Ghana alumni
Alumni of Aburi Girls' Senior High School
21st-century Ghanaian politicians
21st-century Ghanaian women politicians
Cabinet Ministers of Ghana
People from Accra
Women government ministers of Ghana
Attorneys General of Ghana
New Patriotic Party politicians
Female justice ministers
20th-century Ghanaian lawyers